The Embassy of Honduras in London is the diplomatic mission of Honduras in the United Kingdom.

Gallery

References

See also
List of ambassadors of the United Kingdom to Honduras
List of diplomatic missions of Honduras
Embassy of Honduras in Washington, D.C.

Honduras
Diplomatic missions of Honduras
Honduras–United Kingdom relations
Buildings and structures in the City of Westminster
Marylebone